This is a list of newspapers currently published in Anguilla, a British territory in the Caribbean.

Weekly
The Anguillian – The Valley

Official
 Government of Anguilla Document Library – Meeting minutes and statements of the Executive Council and House of Assembly
 Anguilla Official Gazette

News websites
 Anguilla News
 News.ai

See also
 List of newspapers

References

External links
 Website of The Anguillian

Anguilla
Communications in Anguilla
Anguillan culture
newspapers